Tout pour la musique is a studio album by French singer France Gall, released in December 1981.

Track listing

Charts

Weekly charts

Year-end charts

Certifications

References 

France Gall albums
Warner Records albums
1981 albums
Albums produced by Michel Berger